2waytraffic is a television production company based in Hilversum, Netherlands. It was established in 2004 by former Endemol executives Kees Abrahams, Unico Glorie, Taco Ketelaar, and Henk Keilman. It currently has offices in London, New York, Budapest, Stockholm, and Madrid.

2waytraffic also produced a number of phone-in quiz shows like Play, Garito and Game On where viewers could call to a premium-rate phone number for a theoretical chance to earn cash prizes.

History

The company expanded significantly in 2006 with three acquisitions, beginning with Emexus, which provides a technology platform for content aggregation and service and applications delivery in the fields of mobile marketing, mobile entertainment and mobile Internet, in June and then the content developer Intellygents in August. The most notable acquisition, however, was that of the rights of the UK company Celador International and its programme library, including the international Who Wants to Be a Millionaire? franchise, on December 1, 2006.

On March 14, 2007, Celador International Limited was relaunched as 2waytraffic International.

Sony era

On June 4, 2008, 2waytraffic was acquired by 2JS Productions, a subsidiary of Sony Pictures Entertainment. On September 29, 2waytraffic became the distributor of the entertainment formats by SPTI.

On April 1, 2009, Sony Pictures Entertainment consolidated its US and international television companies under the SPT roof such as: 2waytraffic, Embassy Row, Starling, Teleset, and Lean-M. Sony Pictures Television International now operates in-name-only.

In April 2012, it became "Sony Pictures Television International Formats", with the 2waytraffic logo being replaced in next years by the Sony Pictures Television logo on internationally licensed shows. It's currently an in-name-only unit of Sony Pictures Television, with copyrights to 2waytraffic's formats currently being assigned to CPT Holdings, Inc., one of the companies behind Sony Pictures Television.

Companies by 2waytraffic

2waytraffic International, Sony Pictures Television

Formerly Celador International, this company owns, distributes, licenses, and operates over 200 game show formats such as Who Wants to Be a Millionaire? in the United States, UK, Eastern Europe, and Nordic. After SPE acquired 2waytrafic, the international subsidiary became 2waytraffic International, Sony Pictures Television, and was headed by Ed Louwerse.

Emexus Group

Emexus is a mobile solutions company acquired by 2waytraffic on June 13, 2006, which was later renamed as 2waytraffic Mobile.

Intellygents

Intellygents was established in 2002 by former Endemol employees Kirsten van Nieuwenhuijzen and Mark van Berkel, and acquired by 2waytraffic on July 11, 2006. It is a creative developing company for intelligent entertainment, with formats such as That's the Question, Take It or Leave It, The Greatest Royalty Expert and Who Wants to Be a Millionaire'''s first spin-off game show 50:50''.

In 2010, following Sony's acquisition of 60% of Tuvalu Media, Intellygents was integrated into that company.

In December 2013, Tuvalu's management joined forces with financing firm Karmign to acquire SPT's 60% stake in the company. The Intellygents brand had by then been retired, though its formats remain with Tuvalu.

References

Television production companies of the Netherlands
Sony subsidiaries
Sony Pictures Entertainment
Sony Pictures Television
Sony Pictures Television production companies
Pan-European media companies
Dutch companies established in 2004
Mass media in Hilversum
Mass media companies established in 2004